Northman (fl. 994) was a late 10th-century English ealdorman (or earl), with a territorial base in Northumbria north of the River Tees. He appears in two different strands of source. These are, namely, the textual tradition of Durham witnessed by Historia de Sancto Cuthberto and the Durham Liber Vitae, and an appearance in a witness list of a charter of King  Æthelred II dated to 994. The latter is Northman's only appearance south of the Humber, and came the year after Northumbria was attacked by Vikings.

Neither of these witnesses provide a patronymic nor an "earldom". There is a possibility therefore that the two Northmans are different characters, though they are generally thought to be the same. Almost nothing is known about Northman besides being an ealdorman in northern Northumbia, our ignorance extending to the identities of his parents and any children or spouses he may have had.

Durham Northman
The first witness comes from the historical traditions preserved in Durham, related in two connected sources. The former of these is the grant — one of three grants written into a blank leaf at the end of the original volume of the Durham Liber Vitae — ascribed to Earl Northman (the other two to Earl Ulfketil and Earl Thored). Northman's grant is in folio 33v, and is thought to date to the late 10th or early 11th century. It records that Northman gave Escomb (on the River Wear between Witton-le-Wear and Bishop Auckland) to the community of St Cuthbert.

This grant appears to have been used as a source for the Historia de Sancto Cuthberto ("History of St Cuthbert") § 31, which probably made use of several such charters when it was written. The text purports to record a "lease" by Bishop Aldhun, bishop of St Cuthbert (c. 990 – c. 1018), to three different earls:These are the lands which Bishop Aldhun [990–1018] and the whole congregation of St Cuthbert presented to these three, Earl Ethred, Earl Northman and Earl Uhtred: Gainford, Whorlton, Sledwich, Barforth, Startforth, Lartington, Marwood Green, Stainton, Streatlam, Cleatlam, Langton, Morton Tinmouth, Piercebridge, Bishop Auckland and West Auckland, Copeland, Weardseatle, Binchester, Cuthbertestun, Thickley, Escombe, Witton-le-Wear, Hunwick, Newton Cap, Helme Park. Whoever seizes from St Cuthbert any part of these, may he perish on the Day of Judgment. Weardseatle and Cuthbertestun are unidentified, though the historian Ted South thought Weardseatle might be St Andrew Auckland. This list is in fact two blocks of estates, one centred on Gainford around the River Tees and the other around Bishop Auckland on the River Wear.

Wilton Northman
A Norþman dux, "Ealdorman Northmann", witnessed a charter dating to 994 by King Æthelred II ("the Unready"). The charter is a grant of 10 hides at Fovant, Wiltshire, to the church of St Mary, Wilton. He is one of seven ealdormen witnessing the charter, and appears sixth in order, ahead of one Wælðeof dux, probably Waltheof of Bamburgh.

If these identifications are correct, and given that Ælfhelm ealdorman of southern Northumbria appears in the same charter, it is unclear what arrangement allowed both Waltheof and Northman to hold the title of ealdorman in northern Northumbria at the same time. Northumbria in this period was only supposed to have had two ealdormen, as declared earlier in the century by King Eadred of England. One was for Northumbria north of the Tees, and one for the area of south.

Alex Woolf noted that the previous year, 993, the Anglo-Saxon Chronicle related that Scandinavians (apparently led by Óláfr Tryggvason) had invaded Northumbria and sacked Bamburgh, whereupon the southern English raised an army:(s.a. 993) In this year Bamburgh was sacked and much booty was captured there, and after that the army came to the mouth of the Humber and did great damage there, both in Lindsey and in Northumbria. Then a very large English army was collected, and when they should have joined battle, the leaders Fræna, Godwine and Frythegyst, first started the flight. Woolf thought that both Northman and Waltheof were in the south for this reason. The Anglo-Saxon Chronicle reported that, in 994, the year of this charter and the year following the attack on Northumbria, Óláfr Tryggvason and Sveinn Forkbeard attacked London and southern England.

It is not known when or how Northman died, nor who succeeded him directly. Nor can a relationship with any other Northumbria earl be established, though if there is any accuracy or chronological order to the lease notice in the Historia de Sancto Cuthberto, he lived until at least the beginning of Aldhun's episcopate, and was followed by Uhtred the Bold.

Notes

References

External links
 

Anglo-Saxon warriors
Rulers of Bamburgh
Year of birth unknown
Year of death unknown